Sissel Lange-Nielsen, née Herlofson (born 27 January 1931) is a Norwegian writer, literary critic, and journalist.

Born in Kristiansund, she won the Riksmål Society Literature Prize in 1982. She is a member of the Norwegian Academy for Language and Literature.

She was married to barrister and judge Trygve Lange-Nielsen (1921–2014).

References

1931 births
Living people
People from Kristiansund

Norwegian journalists
Norwegian women journalists
Norwegian women critics
Norwegian literary critics
Norwegian women non-fiction writers
Members of the Norwegian Academy
Norwegian women writers